Balashov (also Balashov Southeast, Balasov) is an air base in Russia located 9 km east of Balashov, Saratov Oblast.

The base is home to the 606th Training Aviation Regiment which flies the Antonov An-26 of the 785th Aviation Training Center for Long-Range and Military Transport Aviation.

Michael Holm's data as of 2011 appears to suggest that Balashov as of 1990 was home to the 606th Training Aviation Regiment of the Balashov Higher Military Aviation School for Pilots, subordinated to the Air Forces of the Volga-Ural Military District.

References

Soviet Air Force bases
Russian Air Force bases
Buildings and structures in Saratov Oblast